Tim Ward may refer to:

Tim Ward (American football) (born 1997), American football player
Tim Ward (cricketer), Australian cricketer
Tim Ward (footballer) (1917–1993), English football manager and player
Tim Ward (musician), American musician
Tim Ward (racing driver) (born 1994), American racing driver
Tim Ward (skater) (born 1978), Australian vert skater
Tim Ward (soccer) (born 1987), American soccer player
Tim Ward, developer of 68K/OS